Thornton is a village and civil parish in the East Riding of Yorkshire, England. It lies just to the north of the Pocklington Canal.

According to the 2011 UK census, Thornton parish had a population of 138, exactly the same as on the 2001 UK census.

The village was historically sometimes distinguished by the suffix "in Spalding Moor".

The parish church of St Michael on Main Street is designated a Grade II* listed building.

The other listed structures in the parish are Walbut Lock and Walbut Bridge on the Pocklington Canal, both of which are Grade II listed.

References

External links

Villages in the East Riding of Yorkshire
Civil parishes in the East Riding of Yorkshire